John Robert Hale-Monro (1 May 1902 – 9 June 1959), known as Sonnie Hale, was an English actor, screenwriter, and director.

Early life 
John Robert Hale-Monro was born in Kensington, London, the son of Belle Reynolds and actor Robert Hale. His sister, Binnie Hale, was also an actress. Hale was educated at Beaumont College.

Career 
He worked chiefly in musical and revue theatre, but also acted in several films with occasional screenwriting or directing credits. He first performed on stage at the London Pavilion in 1921 in the chorus of the revue Fun of the Fayre. A major personal investment in a show to tour the country planned for late 1939 proved financially ruinous due to the outbreak of war and the subsequent closure of most theatres. His slight acquaintance Evelyn Waugh advised him against such an investment. His reply was reported to be the sardonic "War is good for business, don't you know!"

Hale's play The French Mistress premiered at Wimbledon Theatre in 1955. It later enjoyed a long West End run, before being adapted into the film A French Mistress.

Personal life and death 
He was married three times, to:
 The actress Evelyn Laye (1926–1930).
 The actress and dancer Jessie Matthews (1931–1944).
 Mary Kelsey (1945–1957)

He left his first marriage to Evelyn Laye for actress Jessie Matthews, an action which led to a backlash among the British public and caused a scandal.
 
By his second marriage he had one son (died at birth) and one adopted daughter (born 1935); by his third marriage he had one son, John Robert Hale-Monro (born 1946, died 2013) and a daughter. He also had a daughter Joanna Monro (born 1956) from a subsequent relationship with the actress Frances Bennett.

He died on 9 June 1959 in London from myelofibrosis, aged 57.

Selected theatre performances 
 Little Nellie Kelly (London production) - 1923 (as Sidney Potter)
 Mercenary Mary - 1925 (as Jerry Warner)
 One Dam Thing After Another (revue) - 1927
 This Year of Grace (revue) - 1928
 Wake Up and Dream (revue) - 1929
 Ever Green - 1930 (as Tommy Thompson)
 Hold My Hand - 1931 (as Pop Curry)
 Come Out to Play (revue) - 1940
 Maid of the Mountains - 1942 (as Tonio)
 One, Two, Three (revue) - 1947
 The Perfect Woman - 1948 (as Freddie Cavendish)
 Rainbow Square - 1951 (as Peppi)
 Lady Be Good - 1955
 The French Mistress - 1959 (as John Crawley)

Filmography

Actor
 Happy Ever After (1932)
 Tell Me Tonight (1932)
 Early to Bed (1933)
 Friday the Thirteenth (1933) 
 Evergreen  (1934)
 Wild Boy (1934)
 Are You a Mason? (1934)
 My Song for You (1934)
 Mon coeur t'appelle (1934)
 My Heart is Calling (1935)
 Marry the Girl (1935)
 First a Girl (1935)
 It's Love Again (1936)
 The Gaunt Stranger (1938)
 Let's Be Famous (1939)
 Fiddlers Three (1944) 
 London Town (1946)

Director
 Head Over Heels (1937)
 Gangway (1937)
 Sailing Along (1938)

References 

 "Oxford Companion to Popular Music" by Peter Grimmond - Publisher OUP 1991 - 
 "Who Was Who in the Theatre: 1912–1976", Vol. 2 D–H - Publisher Pitman London -

External links
 

1902 births
1959 deaths
English male film actors
English film directors
English male screenwriters
English male stage actors
20th-century English male actors
Male actors from London
People educated at Beaumont College
Royal Army Service Corps officers
20th-century English screenwriters
20th-century English male writers